Ibrahim El-Sayed (born 8 September 1941) is an Egyptian wrestler. He competed in the men's Greco-Roman 57 kg at the 1968 Summer Olympics.

References

External links
 

1941 births
Living people
Egyptian male sport wrestlers
Olympic wrestlers of Egypt
Wrestlers at the 1968 Summer Olympics
Sportspeople from Cairo
20th-century Egyptian people